Delta and Dawn, also known as the Delta whales, are two humpback whales, a mother and her calf, who entered San Francisco Bay in early May 2007. Under the Endangered Species Act, California state officials were required to rescue the animals. Their journey was thought to be the longest freshwater incursion by humpback whales.

Efforts to save the whales
Staff from the Marine Mammal Center, researchers, Coast Guard personnel, and volunteers tried several methods to coax Delta and Dawn back downriver. The Marine Mammal Center was appointed by the California Office of Emergency Services as the lead rescue agency. Officials played recordings of the sounds of other humpback whales feeding and socializing to lure them, and banged on submerged metal pipes and sprayed high-powered blasts of water to repel them, but it is not clear whether any of these were particularly effective. There was heightened concern for the whales' well-being this time, because both of them had sizable gash wounds, most likely made from boat keel or propeller strikes. Veterinarians from the Marine Mammal Center and WHOI administered antibiotics to the whales to help heal these deep open wounds, and they took samples of skin lesions incurred during the whales' extended time away from seawater to analyze them for possible freshwater bacterial infection. This was the first time antibiotics had been administered to free swimming whales in the wild.

Return to the sea
On May 20, after languishing for six days in the Sacramento Deep Water Ship Channel, the whales finally started moving. On May 29, however, they again moved quickly, passing under the Benicia Bridge in the morning and swimming through the Carquinez Strait and past yet another pair of bridges. By late afternoon they had continued through San Pablo Bay and were circling just beyond the Richmond-San Rafael Bridge near Tiburon. They were last spotted at sunset that night, within  of the Golden Gate Bridge and the open ocean beyond.

Naming convention
A small controversy arose over what to call the whales as soon as they were spotted far enough upriver to warrant significant attention. Besides being called "the Wayward Whales," they were also dubbed "Momma" and "Baby", "Rio" and "Vista", and "Delta" and "Dawn" (for the Sacramento-San Joaquin River Delta and the 1970s song "Delta Dawn"). California's Lieutenant Governor, John Garamendi, was the one to bestow the last pair of names upon the whales. Their names were inspired by local media contests throughout the region.

Legacy
The story of the wayward whales inspired Stefanie Cruz, a news anchor for Sacramento-based television station KOVR, to write a children's book based on the tale, Delta & Dawn: Mother and Baby Whales' Journey, which was released November 2007. The whales were also parodied by a cartoon.

See also
 List of individual cetaceans
 Humphrey the Whale

References

External links
Following Whales Up a Creek: A conversation with marine mammal biologist Michael Moore

Individual humpback whales
Wayward cetaceans
San Francisco Bay
Whale collisions with ships